Nicole Péry (born 15 May 1943) is a French politician who served as Secretary of State for Women's Rights and Professional Training from 1998 to 2002 under Prime Minister Lionel Jospin. A member of the Socialist Party (PS), she is a professor of literature by occupation.

Péry served as Deputy Mayor of Ciboure from 1977 to 1983, when she became leader of the municipal opposition in Bayonne. She entered the European Parliament in 1981 and the National Assembly in 1997, after she stood as a candidate in the 5th constituency of Pyrénées-Atlantiques. Péry was named special assistant to the Prime Minister for regional languages and cultures in October 1997 before her appointment as a Secretary of State to the Minister of Employment and Solidarity.

Appointments 
1973, 1978, 1981, 1988: parliamentary candidate
1977–1983: Deputy Mayor of Ciboure
1981–1997: Member of European Parliament
1984–1997: Vice-President of the European Parliament
1986–1994: regional councillor of Aquitaine
1997–1998: member of the National Assembly for Pyrénées-Atlantiques, spokeswoman for the Socialist group in the Committee on Foreign Affairs
1997-1998: special assistant to the Prime Minister for regional languages and cultures
1998-2002: Secretary of State for Women's Rights and Vocational Training

Career highlights 
In November 1998, the Government of France reaffirmed its political intent with regards to women's rights by appointing Péry as Secretary of State for Women's Rights and Vocational Training. At that time the Department of Women’s Rights of the Ministry of Employment and Solidarity was the main ad hoc administrative body responsible for monitoring gender equality and anti-discrimination measures. In a speech at Beijing + 5, in New York City on 5 June 2000, she affirmed France's position as an egalitarian nation.

In 2001 she criticised a Benetton advertisement for its portrayal of women's bodies. She was also critical of other advertising campaigns such as Yves Saint Laurent in 2001: "For several years, and with increasing frequency over the past months, advertising has presented images of women which many judge humiliating and degrading" she stated.

Publications 
 La formation professionnelle, Diagnostics, défis et enjeux. 1998

See also 
 Prostitution in France

References

External links 
Official Website: European parliament: N Pery
Rencontre avec Nicole Pery, secrétaire des droits de la femme. Feb 19 2002

1943 births
Living people
People from Bayonne
Politicians from Nouvelle-Aquitaine
Socialist Party (France) MEPs
Secretaries of State of France
Women government ministers of France
Deputies of the 11th National Assembly of the French Fifth Republic
MEPs for France 1979–1984
MEPs for France 1984–1989
MEPs for France 1989–1994
MEPs for France 1994–1999
20th-century women MEPs for France
French feminists
French socialist feminists